Yeditepe University is a private foundation university situated in Istanbul, Turkey. Established by the Istanbul Education and Culture Foundation (İSTEK Vakfı) in 1996, Yeditepe University now claims to be the largest of the 74 foundation universities in Turkey. Students pay fees that vary according to discipline and faculty.

History
The University was established in 1996 by the Istanbul Education and Culture Foundation which seeks to promote educational opportunities on a non-profit basis. it is financially independent of the Turkish Government Treasury Department, not subject to any significant external financial controls or constraints, and receives no income from the state.

Campus

Yeditepe University is principally located in a purpose-built campus at Kayisdagi on the Asian side of Istanbul. However, the Faculty of Dentistry and the University Hospital are located in other locations on the Asian side of the city. The campus consists of 236,000 m2 of built space, and 125,000 m2 or open space. It has 319 classrooms, 22 lecture halls, 32 computer labs, and 74 professional labs for the Fine Arts, Architecture, Communication, Engineering and Sciences Faculties and 2 professional photographic studios.

There are 34 academic administration units, 287 Faculty Offices, 28 student club rooms, a 3000 m2 Central Library equipped with computers with internet access and private reading areas, Residence Halls with a capacity for 1400 people, a multipurpose Conference Hall with a 1200-person seating capacity, a Cinema Complex with a 100-person seating capacity each, a Theatre Hall with a 100 seating capacity, a 524 square meter and 384 square meter professionally equipped two television studios and 200 m2 educational TV studio lab, 150 m2 educational radio facilities, 550 m2 indoor basketball court with seating facilities, and  outdoor basketball courts, outdoor volleyball and tennis courts, indoor and outdoor half Olympic sized swimming pools, 300 m2 fully equipped fitness and aerobics center, 783 m2 modern shopping complex, and large grassy areas with benches and picnic facilities. Parking is in 400 vehicle capacity indoor lots.

The 26 August Campus has a unique architecture feel, inspired by styles of the Seljuk Empire. The main entrance is 22 meters high, opening to a lit courtyard reminiscent of Seljuk architecture. Buildings are covered in Anatolian stone. The symbol of the university is a double-headed eagle, representing men and women. This symbol is present in the main entrance of the campus and repeated elsewhere.

Organization
All academic programs are offered in English except for a program in political science and international relations in French, a program of business administration in German and a program of art and design in Italian.

Currently, Yeditepe University is a signatory to Student Exchange Protocols and Memoranda of Understanding with over 30 universities in the United States and is actively involved with developing the ERASMUS / SOCRATES program with European institutions of higher education.
Yeditepe has signed an educational affiliation agreement with the International University in Geneva.

Yeditepe University comprises eleven faculties, three graduate institutes and one vocational school of higher education:

Faculties 
School of Applied Sciences
Faculty of Architecture
Faculty of Arts and Science
Department of Mathematics 
Faculty of Commerce
Faculty of Communications
Faculty of Dentistry
Faculty of Economics and Administration Sciences
Faculty of Education
Faculty of Engineering
Faculty of Fine Arts
Faculty of Health Sciences
Faculty of Law
Faculty of Medicine
Faculty of Pharmacy

Graduate Institutes 
Institute of Graduate Studies in Science and Engineering
Institute of Health Graduate Studies
Institute of Social Sciences Graduate Studies

Vocational Schools of Higher Education 
School for Advanced Vocational Studies

Students and faculty
According to the University's official web page, the total student population has reached 15,000 (over 20,000 by 2010). Of these, 20% are students enrolled in graduate programs. The teaching staff comprises about 1,350 lecturers of which over two-thirds are full-time faculty members. The current Rector of Yeditepe University is Canan Aykut Bingol.

See also
 List of universities in Turkey

References

External links
 

 
Educational institutions established in 1996
Private universities and colleges in Turkey
Kadıköy
1996 establishments in Turkey
Sultanbeyli